Billy Momo is a Swedish seven piece band based in Stockholm. Their sound is rooted in rock/pop and mixes influences from blues, folk and Americana. The genre is described as urban folk and they have been compared to the sound of an early Tom Waits or Beck.

History
Billy Momo was formed as a duo in 2007. Tomas Juto and Oskar Hovell decided to leave the comforts and tribulations of their previous music endeavors to went into the Swedish woods to collaborate and eventually give birth to an idea that would become Billy Momo. The project has matured and expanded since its beginnings and two men have become seven piece ensemble which includes a guitar, harmonica, banjo, percussionist, and with strings and wind instruments.

Their first album, Ordinary Men, was originally released 2011, and re-released 2013, when the band signed to the British label Hype Music. Billy Momo's second album, Drunktalk was released February 2015. It contains the single "Wishing Ain't No Sin" that was used in the pre trailer for the hit TV series Better Call Saul, both season 1 and season 2. The third album, Seven Rivers Wild, was released November 11, 2016.

Band Members
 Tomas Juto
 Oskar Hovell
 Oscar Harryson
 Tony Lind
 Christopher Anderzon
 Mårten Forssman
 Andreas Prybil

Discography

Studio albums 
 Ordinary Men (2011)
 Drunktalk (2015)
 Seven Rivers Wild (2016)

References

Musical groups from Stockholm
Musical groups established in 2007